Chhatarpur is a city and a municipality in Madhya Pradesh, India.

Chhatarpur may also refer to:
 Chhatarpur district, Madhya Pradesh, India
 Chhatarpur State, a princely state of British India

Vidhan Sabha constituencies
 Chhatarpur (Delhi Assembly constituency)
 Chhatarpur (Jharkhand Assembly constituency)
 Chhatarpur (Madhya Pradesh Assembly constituency)